"Walkin' in the Sunshine" is a song written by Jeff Hanna and Kostas and recorded by Canadian country music group Farmer's Daughter. It was released in 1999 as the first single from their greatest hits album, The Best of Farmer's Daughter. It peaked at number 7 on the RPM Country Tracks chart in January 2000. In 2004, the song was also recorded by Nitty Gritty Dirt Band for their studio album Welcome to Woody Creek.

Chart performance

References

1999 songs
1999 singles
Farmer's Daughter songs
Nitty Gritty Dirt Band songs
Universal Music Group singles
Songs written by Kostas (songwriter)
Songs written by Jeff Hanna